Qatar competed at the 1996 Summer Olympics in Atlanta, United States.

Results by event

Athletics
Men's 4 × 400 m Relay
 Mubarak Faraj, Ali Doka, Sami al-Abdulla, and Hamad al-Dosari
 Heat — 3:08.25 (→ did not advance)

Men's 400m Hurdles
Mubarak Faraj
Heat — 49.27s (→ did not advance)

Men's 800m
Abdul Rahman Al-Abdullah
Heat — 1:48.52s (→ did not advance)

Men's 3,000 metres Steeplechase
Jamal Abdi Hassan
 Heat — 8:36.99
 Semifinals — 8:36.40 (→ did not advance)

References
Official Olympic Reports
sports-reference

Nations at the 1996 Summer Olympics
1996
Olympics